Events from the year 1763 in Canada.

Incumbents
French Monarch: Louis XV (abdicated February 10)
British and Irish Monarch: George III

Governors
Governor of the Province of Quebec: Jeffery Amherst
Colonial Governor of Louisiana: Louis Billouart
Governor of Nova Scotia: Jonathan Belcher
Commodore-Governor of Newfoundland: Richard Edwards

Events
With the Royal Proclamation of 1763 Lower Canada was renamed the "Province of Quebec".

 1763–1820 The Conquest: French defeated. British take over and successfully expand fur trade from Montreal (North West Company). Much money is invested in Montreal.
 1763–64 – Pontiac's Rebellion threatens British control of the Great Lakes region before being suppressed.
 1763–66: Pontiac's Rebellion, an American Indian revolt, is suppressed by the English in Canada. Ottawa Chief Pontiac (c. 1720–1769) leads an Indian uprising but the British defeat the Indians.
 Thursday February 10 – By the treaty of Paris, France cedes to Britain, Canada and all the Laurentian Islands, except St. Pierre and Miquelon.
 April 11 – Britain allows Canadians the free exercise of their religion.
 April 18 – The folk hero Marie-Josephte Corriveau was sentenced to death by a British court martial for murdering her second husband, and was hanged in Quebec city.
 December 7 – Canadians are required to swear fealty.
 Proclamation by King George III bans settlements west of the Appalachians and establishes a protected Indian Country there. White settlers ignore the boundary line – Indian raids in Pennsylvania lead to the Paxton Riots – Peaceful Conestoga Mission Indians are massacred by settlers.
 Pontiac fails to take Detroit, because of informers alerting the English to his plans; as winter approaches, his army of Indians lost faith in victory, and returned to their homes. Aware that England and France had ended both their European and American wars, Pontiac tried to start a second uprising, later counseled peace, and was killed in 1769 in Illinois by a Peoria Indian who was probably an assassin hired by the English.
 The prophetic say that the acquisition of Canada will cost England her colonies. "No longer requiring protection, they will be asked to support burdens, which their necessities have brought upon the mother country, and will answer by striking off all dependence."

Births
December 23 – John Kinzie, Fur trader from Quebec City who was responsible for the "first murder in Chicago" (d. June 6, 1828)

Deaths
 April 18 – Marie-Josephte Corriveau, criminal (born 1733)

Historical documents
Treaty of Paris 1763 confirms Canada, Cape Breton and Nova Scotia for Britain, and limited Newfoundland and Gulf fishing rights for France

British ambassador ordered to discover how French intend to disrupt British rule in North American cessions and encroach on Newfoundland fishery

Province of Quebec established with limits to settlement on Indigenous lands beyond its borders, and on settlers buying such land within province

"Various Conjectures" - Benjamin Franklin summarizes reasons people are giving for attacks made on British by Indigenous people west of Lake Huron

Despite Ojibwe chief Wawatam's warning, Alexander Henry witnesses massacre of British at Michilimackinac but is saved by enslaved Pawnee woman

Teenager recounts being taken, enslaved, adopted, sold and rescued among Ojibwe, Odawa and French (Note: gruesome details; "savage" used)

Character traits needed by North American commander-in-chief to deal well with Indigenous people (Note: racial stereotypes)

Prospectus for weekly bilingual newspaper in Montreal, to aid anglophones and francophones learning each other's language, as well as deliver news

"Correspondence increases Commerce" - Quebec merchants want postal service, but will have postmaster and military express handle their mail

Maple sugaring near Sault Ste. Marie involves sugar shack with 20-foot-long fireplace, birchbark sap ducts and 100 gallon moosehide vats

Nova Scotia Lt. Gov. Wilmot warns against letting dangerous Acadian group "bigotted to France and the Church of Rome" settle on Miramichi

Acadians are not to be persuaded to move to France; instead "settle them in some distant District of Canada"

Each Nova Scotia county quarter session is to make rules about river obstructions (weirs, fish garths, seines etc.) that may affect fish spawning

At annual Nova Scotia township meetings, freeholders will appoint board of 12 residents to decide who should receive funds voted for poor relief

"In order to prevent the increase of Billiard Tables and Shuffle Boards" in Nova Scotia, owners must get annual £10 licence, or risk £20 fine

"Over populous[...]in the Island they at present inhabit," Nantucket mariners want to relocate to St. John's Island to take cod and whales

To evade violently anti-British Indigenous people, Alexander Henry dons variety of Ojibwe clothing and ornaments

Though injured by snowshoeing from Michilimackinac to Sault Ste. Marie, Alexander Henry refuses local remedy for "snow-shoe evil"

References 

 
Canada
63